This article describes the knockout stage of the 2016–17 EHF Champions League.

Qualified teams
The top six placed teams from each of the two groups advanced to the knockout stage.

Format
12 teams played home and away in the first knock-out phase, with the 10 teams qualified from groups A and B and the two teams qualified from groups C and D. After that, the six winners of these matches in the first knock-out phase joined with the winners of groups A and B to play home and away for the right to play in the final four.

Round of 16

Overview

|}

Matches

Paris Saint-Germain won 61–53 on aggregate.

Montpellier won 61–54 on aggregate.

Telekom Veszprém won 52–41 on aggregate.

Pick Szeged won 59–48 on aggregate.

Flensburg-Handewitt won 54–51 on aggregate.

THW Kiel won 50–49 on aggregate.

Quarterfinals

|}

Matches

Barcelona won 49–46 on aggregate.

Vardar won 61–51 on aggregate.

Paris Saint-Germain won 60–57 on aggregate.

Telekom Veszprém won 56–48 on aggregate.

Final four
The final four was held at the Lanxess Arena in Cologne, Germany on 3 and 4 June 2017.

The draw was held on 2 May 2017 in Cologne, Germany at 12:00.

Bracket

Semifinals

Third place game

Final

References

External links
Final four website

knockout stage